McKay is a masculine given name. Notable people with the name include:

 McKay Christensen (born 1975), American baseball player
 McKay Coppins (born 1987), American journalist and author
 McKay McKinnon, American physician

See also
 Mackay (disambiguation)

English-language masculine given names